Abdul Aziz Naji is an Algerian citizen who was held without charges in the United States Guantanamo Bay detention camp in Cuba.
His Guantanamo Internment Serial Number was 744.  
American intelligence analysts report that he was born on May 4, 1975, in Batna, Algeria.

Naji arrived at Guantanamo on August 5, 2002, and was repatriated to Algeria, against his will, in July 2010.

The Obama administration transferred Abdul Aziz Naji to Algeria in July 2010. Naji argued that he would face a high risk to be tortured in Algeria when he would be forced to return to that country but he lost his case before the Supreme Court. Human Rights Watch has heavily criticized the Obama administration for their decision.

On July 25, 2010, he was indicted by the government of Algeria and placed under judicial supervision though it is not known what he had been charged with or what the supervision entailed.

Background

Abdul Aziz Naji asserts he was in Pakistan as an aid worker, performing zakat—charitable work.
He described losing a leg to a land mine while performing charitable service near embattled Kashmir.
He lost his leg prior to al Qaeda's attack on the USA, and spent a year in medical rehabilitation in Pakistan.
His capture came shortly after his release from the hospital during a trip to Peshawar, where he was to meet a marriage broker.

Clearance by Obama Administration's Guantanamo Review Task Force

No charges have ever been brought against Mr. Naji by the US government.
On May 20, 2009, he was cleared for transfer by the Guantanamo Review Task Force established by President Obama’s Executive Order of January 22, 2009.

Habeas corpus

Abdul Aziz Naji had a habeas corpus appeal initiated on his behalf in 2005.

On July 15, 2008, Kristine A. Huskey filed a "NOTICE OF PETITIONERS’ REQUEST FOR 30-DAYS NOTICE OF TRANSFER" on behalf of these captives whose names are not on any of the official lists.

His most recent attorneys are Ellen Lubell and Doris Tennant, of Newton, Massachusetts.
Lubell and Tennant appealed to Newton's city council to follow the example of neighboring Amherst and offer sanctuary to their client.

Disappearance alleged
In an email, dated July 23, 2010, Bill Quigley, Legal Director of Center for Constitutional Rights, states that Abdul Aziz Naji, had gone missing after the US sent him back to Algeria against his will and that Abdul Aziz Naji did not want to return to Algeria because he feared persecution from both the Algerian government and militant anti-government forces. Mr. Naji had applied for political asylum in Switzerland, and his application was proceeding through the Swiss courts.

January 2012 conviction

Naji was convicted on January 16, 2012, of “belonging to a terrorist group abroad”.
Naji had asserted he had been a charity worker in Afghanistan—not a fighter.
According to the human rights group Reprieve the prosecution didn't introduce new evidence against him, only introducing the untested allegations from Guantanamo.

Swiss asylum request

In June 2013, the Swiss Broadcasting Corporation reported that Abdul Aziz Naji had requested asylum in Switzerland, in 2009.
Switzerland's Federal Migration Office turned down his asylum request.
His lawyer appealed to Switzerland's Federal Administrative Court, which ruled, on December 10, 2009, that the justifications for turning down the asylum request were vague and inadequate.  They ruled that the decision on his asylum request would have to be re-done.

In June 2013, the Federal Migration Office responded to queries as to why it had not reviewed Abdul Aziz Naji's request.  They wrote:
“The duration of asylum proceedings is dependent on various factors, notably possible additional investigations being done to clarify the case, but also the priority order in which cases are being treated.”

References

External links

UPDATE 2-"Missing" Guantanamo returnee back at home -family Reuters Jul 26, 2010
UPDATE 1-Whereabouts of former US detainee unknown-lawyers Reuters Jul 21, 2010
UN experts urge US to ensure no Guantánamo detainees are forcibly returned United Nations
Six detainees would rather stay at Guantanamo Bay than be returned to Algeria The Washington Post July 10, 2010
Profiles of Guantanamo Detainees in Need of Safe Haven

1975 births
Living people
Algerian extrajudicial prisoners of the United States
Guantanamo detainees known to have been released
People from Batna, Algeria
Algerian expatriates in Pakistan